Walter Travers (1548? – 1635) was an English Puritan theologian. He was at one time chaplain to William Cecil, 1st Baron Burghley, and tutor to his son Robert Cecil, 1st Earl of Salisbury.

He is remembered mostly as an opponent of the teaching of Richard Hooker. He was educated at the University of Cambridge, where he was admitted to Christ's College before migrating to Trinity, and then travelled to Geneva to visit Theodore Beza. He was ordained by Thomas Cartwright in Antwerp, where in the late 1570s his work was favoured by the encouragement of Sir Francis Walsingham and Henry Killigrew (diplomat). He was a lecturer at the Temple Church in London in 1581, until he was forbidden to preach by Archbishop Whitgift in March 1586.

He was Provost of Trinity College Dublin from 1594 to 1598.

References

1540s births
1635 deaths
Alumni of Christ's College, Cambridge
Anglican chaplains
English chaplains
16th-century English educators
Provosts of Trinity College Dublin
16th-century Anglican theologians
16th-century English Puritan ministers
16th-century English theologians
17th-century Anglican theologians
17th-century English clergy
17th-century English educators
17th-century English theologians